The Cincinnati Bengals Radio Network is an American radio network consisting of 37 radio stations which carry coverage of the Cincinnati Bengals, a professional football team in the NFL.  Three Cincinnati radio stations—WCKY (1530 AM), WEBN (102.7 FM), and WLW (700 AM)—serve as the network's flagship stations; WLW also simulcasts over a low-power FM translator.  The network also includes 39 affiliates in the U.S. states of Ohio, Kentucky, Indiana, and West Virginia: 27 AM stations, 18 of which extend their signals with one or more low-power FM translators; and 12 full-power FM stations.  Dan Hoard is the current play-by-play announcer, while Dave Lapham serves as color commentator.  In addition to traditional over-the-air AM and FM broadcasts, the Bengals are available on SiriusXM satellite radio, and online with NFL Audio Pass.

History

Following the 1996 Bengals season, the team ended its radio partnership with Jacor Broadcasting. Jacor had also been responsible for overseeing a network of 35 stations for the team, which had been fronted by WLW (the flagship station from 1968 to 1981 and from 1993 to 1996). Citing a desire to "control content... outside the parameters of gameday broadcasts", the Bengals opted for a new three-year agreement with Chancellor Media.  Cincinnati sports talk WKYN and country station WUBE-FM took over as flagship stations for a new network also run by Chancellor.  Soon, however, both Chancellor and Jacor would be acquired by Clear Channel, and in 1999, the team itself signed a six-year contract with the radio giant. The team renewed this agreement with Clear Channel in 2005; Cincinnati stations WSAI (which was WCKY (1360 AM) prior to 2005; WSAI's programming and co-flagship rights were transferred to WCKY (1530 AM) in July 2006) and WOFX-FM continued to share flagship duties for the Bengals Radio Network, which by this time included 23 stations in Ohio, Kentucky, and West Virginia.  Former network flagship WLW served as a co-flagship station when it did not conflict with game broadcasts over the Cincinnati Reds Radio Network, a practice which continues to the present day. As WLW and WCKY are both 50,000-watt clear-channel stations, their combined footprints allow Bengals night games to be heard across almost all of North America.

Rock station WEBN became the network's new FM flagship in 2008, a change resulting from Clear Channel's sale of WOFX-FM to Cumulus Media (the U. S. Department of Justice had required the sale of WOFX-FM and WNNF to approve a leveraged buyout of Clear Channel itself).  The team subsequently renewed its agreement with Clear Channel (now iHeartMedia) again in 2011 and 2014.

Station list

Blue background indicates low-power FM translator.

Network maps

References

External links
Bengals Radio Network
SiriusXM.com: Cincinnati Bengals
NFL Audio Pass

Cincinnati Bengals
Mass media in Cincinnati
National Football League on the radio
Sports radio networks in the United States